Shane Claiborne (born July 11, 1975) is a Christian activist and author who is a leading figure in the New Monasticism movement and one of the founding members of the non-profit organization, The Simple Way, in Philadelphia, Pennsylvania. Claiborne is also a social activist, advocating for nonviolence and service to the poor. He is the author of the book,  The Irresistible Revolution: Living as an Ordinary Radical.

Biography
Claiborne grew up in east Tennessee. His father, who was a Vietnam War veteran, died when Shane was 9 years old. A graduate of Eastern University, where he studied sociology and youth ministry, Claiborne did his final academic work for Eastern University at Wheaton College in Illinois. While at Wheaton, Claiborne did an internship at Willow Creek Community Church. He has done some graduate work at Princeton Theological Seminary, but took a leave of absence, and now is a part of The Alternative Seminary in Philadelphia.

Claiborne worked alongside Mother Teresa during a 10-week term in Calcutta. He has written about how his work with Mother Teresa impacted him and made him realize the need to support a consistent life ethic, to protect all human life from conception to natural death. He spent three weeks in Baghdad with the Iraq Peace Team (IPT), a project of Voices in the Wilderness and Christian Peacemaker Teams. He was witness to the military bombardment of Baghdad as well as the militarized areas between Baghdad and Amman. As a member of IPT, Claiborne took daily trips to sites where there had been bombings, visited hospitals and families, and attended worship services during the war. He also continues to serve as a board member for the nationwide Christian Community Development Association which was founded by the authors and community developers, John Perkins and Wayne Gordon.

On June 20, 2007, a seven-alarm fire at the abandoned warehouse across the street destroyed The Simple Way Community Center where Claiborne lived. He lost all of his possessions in the fire. The Simple Way immediately set up funds to accept donations to help those who lost their homes in the fire.

Claiborne is featured in the documentary The Ordinary Radicals, and co-directed the three volume Another World is Possible DVD series. Claiborne wrote the foreword to Ben Lowe's 2009 book Green Revolution: Coming Together to Care for Creation.

In 2011 he has appeared as both a guest and co-host of the TV show Red Letter Christians with Tony Campolo. That year also, he declared his unwillingness to pay taxes to fund U.S. military activity. He withheld a portion of his income taxes meant to correspond to the percentage of the federal budget spent on the military, donating that money instead to charity. He wrote a public letter to the Internal Revenue Service to explain his decision.

On May 7, 2011, Shane Claiborne married Katie Jo Brotherton.

On January 26, 2016, he released his first solo book in ten years, Executing Grace - How the Death Penalty Killed Jesus and Why It's Killing Us. It makes a case for the abolition of the death penalty through social and spiritual arguments, and received praise from John Perkins, Philip Yancey and Desmond Tutu, among others.

Authorship
Beating Guns: Hope for People Who Are Weary of Violence, with Michael Martin (Grand Rapids: Brazos Press, 2019) 
Executing Grace - How the Death Penalty Killed Jesus and Why It's Killing Us (Harper Collins, 2016) 
The Irresistible Revolution - Updated and Expanded 10th Anniversary Edition (Grand Rapids: Zondervan, 2016) 
Common Prayer: A Liturgy for Ordinary Radicals, with Jonathan Wilson-Hartgrove and Enuma Okoro (Grand Rapids: Zondervan, 2010) 
"What If Jesus Meant All That Stuff?" (Esquire Magazine, November 18, 2009) 
Follow Me To Freedom: Leading and Following as an Ordinary Radical, with John Perkins (Regal Books, 2009) 
Jesus for President: Politics for Ordinary Radicals, with Chris Haw (Grand Rapids: Zondervan, 2008) 
Becoming the Answer to Our Prayers: Prayer for Ordinary Radicals, with Jonathan Wilson-Hartgrove (InterVarsity, 2008) 
 The Irresistible Revolution: Living as an Ordinary Radical (Grand Rapids: Zondervan, 2006) 
Iraq Journal 2003 (Doulos Christou, 2006)

See also
 Simple living

References

External links

 Claiborne's official page with Tony Campolo at the Red Letter Christians
 The Simple Way organization's official website
 The Ordinary Radicals official website
 The Another World is Possible DVD series
 Shane Claiborne's sermon on radical discipleship

1975 births
American Christian pacifists
American consistent life ethics activists
American evangelicals
American tax resisters
Christian radicals
Evangelical writers
Christianity and environmentalism
Eastern University (United States) alumni
Living people
Nonviolence advocates
People from Tennessee
Political activists from Pennsylvania
Wheaton College (Illinois) alumni
Writers from Philadelphia